USS S-9 (SS-114) was a second-group ( or "Government") S-class submarine of the United States Navy. Her keel was laid down on 20 January 1919 by the Portsmouth Navy Yard. She was launched on 17 June 1920 sponsored by Mrs. James E. Palmer, and commissioned on 21 February 1921.

Following duty off the northeast coast, S-9 sailed from New London, Connecticut, on 31 May 1921, and proceeded via the Panama Canal, California, and Pearl Harbor to the Philippines, arriving at Cavite, Luzon on 6 December. There, she joined Submarine Division 12 (SubDiv 12), whose S-boats — along with those of SubDiv 18 — had arrived on 1 December. In 1922, she sailed from Cavite on 11 October visited Hong Kong from 14 to 28 October, and returned to Cavite on 31 October. On 30 April 1923, she departed from Cavite and visited Shanghai, Chefoo, and Chinwangtao, China, before returning via Woosung and Amoy to Cavite on 11 September. On 23 June 1924, she sailed from Manila Bay and again visited ports in China before returning to Olongapo on 23 September.

Departing from Cavite on 29 October, S-9 arrived at Mare Island, California on 30 December. Remaining at Mare Island in 1925, she operated along the United States West Coast in 1926, mainly at San Francisco, San Pedro Submarine Base-San Pedro, and San Diego, California. Departing Mare Island on 11 February 1927, she operated in the Panama Canal area from March into April, arrived at New London on 3 May, and spent the remainder of 1927 along the northeast coast. S-9 served in the Panama Canal area from February–April 1928, from January–March 1929, and from January–March 1930. Departing New London on 22 October, S-9 was decommissioned on 15 April 1931 at Philadelphia, Pennsylvania. She was struck from the Naval Vessel Register on 25 January 1937.

References

Ships built in Kittery, Maine
United States S-class submarines
1920 ships